William Saunders (January 17, 1806 – June 30, 1851) was a poet and writer in Welsh, whose work won prizes at eisteddfodau in Carmarthen and elsewhere. He was a printer by trade.

Birth and education
William Saunders was born on 17 January 1806 at Gwarcwm, Llanllwni, Carmarthenshire, the son of a farmer, Evan Saunders. He went to school in the local village of Castellhywel and then to Carmarthen Grammar School.

After completing school, he became apprenticed to a printer in Carmarthen. He later joined the workforce of Samuel Williams, a printer in Aberystwyth, Cardiganshire.

Poetry and printing
While working in Aberystwyth, Saunders gained prominence for his nature poems and for metrical translations. He won eisteddfod prizes in Carmarthen and other places. His titles included "Y Gwanwyn" (Spring), "Yr Haf" (Summer), "Yr Hydref" (Autumn), "Y Gaeaf" (Winter), "Y Daran" (Clap) and "Y Môr" (The Sea).

In 1830 Saunders moved to the printing and publishing firm of William Rees (1808–1873) in the smaller market town of Llandovery, Carmarthenshire. He continued to work there until his death, on 30 June 1851.

Namesake
Another poet and author named William Saunders, not known to be related to him, wrote in English in the mid-20th century.

References

1806 births
1851 deaths
Welsh-language poets
19th-century Welsh poets
Welsh male poets
Welsh translators
People from Carmarthenshire
People from Aberystwyth
People from Llandovery
19th-century British translators